Beezer may refer to:

 The Beezer, a British children's comic
 Robert Beezer (1928–2012), American federal judge
 John Vanbiesbrouck (born 1963), American ice hockey player nicknamed "Beezer"
 Beezer, robot companion to comic book character Captain Sternn

See also
 Beazer (disambiguation)